Robin Taylor may refer to:

 Robin Lord Taylor, American actor and director
 Robin L. Taylor, lawyer and politician in Alaska

See also
Robin Tyler, American comedian